ICC U19 Cricket World Cup Europe Qualifier (formerly ICC Europe Under-19 Championships) are a series of regular cricket tournaments organised by the ECC for Under-19 teams from its member nations. The first event took place in 1999 and is the only Under-19 championship to be played yearly. Traditionally there have always been two divisions though the nature of these divisions has varied strongly over the years. The current champions are Scotland who finished top of 2015 Division One.

History

The first edition of the tournament was played in 1999 in Northern Ireland. The teams were split across two divisions, the more developed cricketing nations of Ireland, Scotland, Netherlands and Denmark joining England in the A Championship and three other associates, Gibraltar, Italy and Germany forming the B Championship. England won the tournament easily and would not participate again.

Following this inaugural competition, the higher, eventually referred to as Division One, was played every year between Ireland, Scotland, Netherlands and Denmark. Every other year, the Division Two tournament was also played alongside. In 2003, France debuted in the second division, later joined by Belgium and Israel in 2005 and by Jersey, Guernsey and the Isle of Man in 2007.

In 2003, a different approach was taken with all the teams across both divisions participating in a preliminary qualification round. However, this did not affect the make-up of the divisions whatsoever as the four more developed nations easily overpowered the others and cemented their position in Division One. After this the system was abandoned and the old format was reintroduced the following year.

A fresh initiative for the 2006 edition was a new two-day format for Division One. The aim of this was to provide the players with some practice for the style of multi-day play encountered in the Intercontinental Cup. The one-day format returned the following year.

2007 saw the two divisions being played separately for the first time when Division One was located in Ireland, but the nine-team Division Two was played in Jersey. This was Jersey's first ever European cricket competition.

Another change was made to the division format in 2009 when Jersey and Guernsey were relocated into Division One. This evened out the number of teams across the divisions and a win from Jersey over Denmark demonstrated their ability to play in the top flight. As a result, the two teams remained for the 2010 tournament where both teams performed even better than the previous year.

Plans have been unveiled that in 2011, for the first time, there will be a chance of promotion from Division Two. The total number of participants will also be increased from thirteen to fifteen.

Tournament results

Division One

Division Two

Participating teams (Division One)
Legend
 – Champions
 – Runners-up
 – Third place
 – Hosts
X – Qualified but withdrew

See also

European Cricket Championship

References

Under-19 regional cricket tournaments